Bob and Margaret is an adult animated television series created by David Fine and Alison Snowden and produced by Nelvana. The series was based on the Academy Award-winning short film Bob's Birthday, featuring the same main characters, which won the Best Animated Short Film Oscar in 1994. In Canada, it was the highest-rated Canadian-made animated series ever when it aired in primetime on Global.

Plot
The show revolved around a married English couple named Bob and Margaret Fish, a middle class 40-ish working couple with two dogs named William and Elizabeth, and no children. Bob is a dentist and Margaret is a chiropodist. Bob and Margaret struggle with everyday issues and mid-life crises. Stories often revolve around the mundane, but in a way that is eminently relatable, from the trials of shopping to dealing with friends who annoy them but owe them a dinner. They are often seen enjoying takeaway Chinese or Indian food.

In the first two seasons, Bob and Margaret lived in England, in the South London community of Balham. For the third and fourth seasons, they moved to Toronto, Ontario, Canada, allowing the writers to explore the humour of culture clash. The move was actually inspired by the realities of funding, with certain Canadian tax benefits dependent on stories actually based in Canada; as such, the move was necessary to keep the series funded. The series' creators of the series (real-life husband and wife David Fine and Alison Snowden) chose to take an executive role on these latter two seasons, reviewing scripts and consulting, but not involved in much detail as they were for the first two seasons. Snowden continued to provide Margaret's voice, but Brian George  replaced Andy Hamilton as Bob's voice.

Characters

Main characters
 Bob Fish (voiced by Andy Hamilton in Season 1 and 2, Brian George in Season 3 and 4): is English dentist working in South London in the district of Clapham. He is the husband of Margaret and his parents are Daisy and Cesal Fish. Bob's brother Peter is a successful world-class television chef, and his sister Susan is a recent divorcée and single mother. His father is deceased and only appears in flashbacks. His mother is still alive and very mean-spirited toward Bob but showers admiration and adoration on Peter. Throughout the series Bob is portrayed as the kindest, most understanding member of his family, but there are times he is arrogant and ignorant. in Season 3, he is forced to emigrates with Margaret to Toronto in order to secure legal custody of their dogs William and Elizabeth. He later becomes the primary dentist at the Inner City Dental clinic. 
 Margaret Fish (voiced by Alison Snowden): Bob's wife Margaret is portrayed as an English chiropodist working in South London. Her parents, Tony and Maureen Heslop, greatly adore her husband Bob but show little to no respect for their own daughter Margaret, who resents them for it but silently. Throughout the series she was portrayed as caring and very passive, which leads other people to take advantage of her, but she learns to stand up for herself when the occasion calls for it. At one time she was accidentally classified as a terrorist by the London police department, who even attempted to assassinate her until they were informed that she was innocent. in Season 3, she is forced to emigrate to Toronto with Bob where she becomes the lead podiatrist at the Women's Clinic. Margaret has appeared in every episode with Bob.

Canadian-based characters
 Melvin and Cookie Fish (Melvin voiced by Wayne Robson and Cookie voiced by Jayne Eastwood): Melvin and Cookie Fish are Bob's friendly Canadian cousins from the Toronto suburb of Mississauga; they both have carefree attitudes and always have a positive, humorous view of life. The series depicts them as being proud Canadians who always need to compare Toronto to London (and once to New York City, in "Stranded in Toronto") with Toronto always coming out far ahead. They love and adore Bob and Margaret but unknowingly annoy them on numerous occasions, for example playing their vacation videos about their visits to London, which turn up all the hilarious, humiliating moments of their taping Bob and Margaret at their worst times. The couple have two aggressive cats named Buster and Bailey. They first appeared in the episode "The Discomfort of Strangers" in Season 1 and return as minors in Seasons 3 and 4.  
 Heather (voiced by Vickie Papavs): Heather is a secretary at the Inner City Dental Clinic working in Bob's dental office in Toronto and has similar attributes to Penny in terms of facial expression but is kinder and less judgmental with a carefree attitude.
 Ed, Patel, and Audra: Ed and Patel are two other dentists working at the Inner City Dental Clinic with Bob. Ed is a defined as a Canadian woodsman; Patel is an Indian hygienist who encourages Bob to take on challenges for success. In one episode, Ed and Patel fight when they and Bob head out on a camping adventure. Audra is Bob's other dental hygienist who works in his Toronto dental clinic.
 Robin (voiced by Yanna McIntosh): is a reflexologist working at the women's clinic in Toronto, who employs Margaret as the clinic's podiatrist. She appears to be of Jamaican descent.   
 Guinevere Long (voiced by Tracey Hoyt): Guinevere is chiropractic intern at women's clinic in Toronto, seen as calm and friendly to Margaret.
 Trevor and Joyce: (Trevor voiced by Dwayne Hill and Joyce voiced by Robin Duke later Jayne Eastwood): Trevor and Joyce are Bob and Margaret's next-door neighbours in Toronto. Trevor is a lazy, alcoholic couch potato, and his wife Joyce is a hardworking smoker. The couple is mostly seen quarreling.
 Dr Yosselhifer (voiced by Harvey Atkin): is the president of the Council of Canadian Dentistry. He is seen as ruthless, egotistic, and insecure towards Bob.
 Dr Klein (voiced by Benedict Campbell): is a plastic surgeon who helps remove a questionable skin mole for Margaret.
 Ray and Tiffany (Ray voiced by Christian Potenza): Tiffany is Cousin Melvin's goddaughter, and Ray was her fiancé in "The Wedding."
 Gary: Trevor and Joyce's son, a former army cadet who has a crush on Bob's secretary Heather.
 Alice and Lyle: a former married couple whose photograph package is accidentally mixed up with Bob's at the pharmacy. 
 Angie and Cheryl: two youth delinquents and offenders who are sentenced to serve out their community service with Margaret.
 Mickey Musselman: is a business owner of furniture store and political candidate running for Alderman in Ward 9, he runs against Jimmy the Clown, Carl Schultz and Margaret in a local byelection. He is loosely inspired by former Toronto Mayor Mel Lastman.
 Elizabeth Roth: was a former candidate for Alderman in Ward 9. She relapses due to alcoholism prompting Margaret to takeover her campaign.
 Tanya (voiced by Terri Hawkes): is a member of book club in which Margaret joins, she appears in the episode (Book club). Hawkes also voices multiple roles in other episodes including (The Getaway), (The Candidate) and (Mastermind). 
 TV announcer (voiced by Mark Dailey)

British-based characters
 Daisy: Bob's mother.
 Peter: (voiced by Steve Coogan): Bob's brother, a successful television chef.
 Neil and Moira: (Neil voiced by Jamie Watson and Moira voiced by Doon Mackichan): Appears in season 1 ("Friends for Dinner").
 Dorothy: (voiced by Doon Mackichan): Appears in season 1 ("A Tale of Two Dentists").
 Dr.Stanway: (voiced by Steve Coogan): Appears in "A Tale of Two Dentists".
 Gerald and Charlotte: (both voiced by Lily Snowden): Peter's children who appear in the episode ("For Pete's Sake") in season 1.
 Beany and Boney: (Beany was voiced by Steve Brody): Two burglars from London.
 Bernard Wiggins: (Voiced by Steve Coogan): Appears in season 1 ("The Dental Convention").
 Kitty and Larry: (Kitty voiced by Alison Snowden and Larry voiced by Jamie Watson): Appears in season 1 ("Neighbours").
 Cathy and Ken: (Ken voiced by Steve Brody): Cathy and Ken are an overbearing couple who were friends with Margaret back in London, but Bob despises them. Cathy often becomes annoyed by Ken's antics and becomes regretful whenever something bad happens to him. They first appeared in the episode ("Blood, Sweat, and Tears") in season 1.
 Eden:(voiced by Doon Mackichan): Eden (Edie) is Margaret's former secretary at her London chiropody clinic.
 Penny:(voiced by Doon Mackichan): After the arrest of "Dorothy" (who was suspected to have been an accomplice in patient molestations), Bob's secretary at his former dental office in London, Penny becomes her replacement. She is characterised as a lazy, irresponsible and neglectful employee with an attitude problem. Penny (at her boyfriend's urging) was actually responsible for Bob and Margaret having death threats hurled at them from violent protesters and being forced to flee London when word got out that their dogs were being neglected.  
 Mr. Perkins: Howard Perkins owns a flower shop and briefly hires Penny away from Bob.
 Rachel: Dr. Rachel Turbull is a clinical therapist and a former friend of Margaret. Her partner is Matt who runs an Alcoholic Anonymous meeting to whom Bob makes all to lose their sobriety due to his depressing stories.

Series overview

Episodes

Season 1 (1998-1999)
 All episodes in Season 1 are directed by Jamie Whitney, Andrew Young and Jason Groh

Season 2 (1999)

Season 3 (2001)

Season 4 (2001)

Telecast and home media
The programme was shown in the United Kingdom on Channel 4 and Ftn, in the U.S. on Comedy Central, and in Germany and France on Arte. Comedy Central only showed the two "London" seasons. The third and fourth "Toronto" seasons were eventually shown (almost two years after Comedy Central showed the last second-season episode) on Showtime.

Bob and Margaret formerly aired on Locomotion, and Adult Swim Latin America. Cartoon Network Brazil aired its four seasons on the Adult Swim block. The London seasons also get shown in the United Kingdom, currently on Channel 4. It also had a brief run years later on the Canadian YTV. In December 2013, biTe started to air this series (until the rebrand to Makeful on August 24, 2015).

VHS and DVD

United Kingdom
Two VHS tapes of the series containing three Series 1 episodes each were released in 1999 by Video Collection International under their Channel 4 Video imprint.

The entirety of Series 2 was released on DVD in July 2006 by Maverick Entertainment.

US/Canada
In 1999, Season 1 was released on six VHS volumes by Paramount Home Entertainment containing two episodes each. 

In Canada, the series has seen DVD releases. Series 2 was released in 2005 by Kaboom! Entertainment and Phase 4 Films, and Season 1 was released in February 2010 by Phase 4 Films/Kaboom!. Both releases are two-disc sets containing all 13 episodes of each season.

Online streaming
The third and the fourth seasons can be viewed in Amazon Video and iTunes. Currently, the show is now streaming on Tubi, and Pluto TV in the United Kingdom.

See also
 O Canada (TV series), Cartoon Network series that featured "Bob's Birthday"
 Ricky Sprocket: Showbiz Boy

References

External links

 
 SnowdenFine.com — the creators' website

1990s British adult animated television series
1990s British animated comedy television series
2000s Canadian adult animated television series
2000s Canadian animated comedy television series
2000s British adult animated television series
2000s British animated comedy television series
1998 British television series debuts
2001 British television series endings
1998 Canadian television series debuts
2001 Canadian television series endings
1990s Canadian adult animated television series
1990s Canadian animated comedy television series
British adult animated comedy television series
Canadian adult animated comedy television series
English-language television shows
Fictional married couples
Global Television Network original programming
Channel 4 original programming
Channel 4 comedy
YTV (Canadian TV channel) original programming
Television series by Nelvana
Television series about couples
1990s Canadian medical television series
1990s British medical television series
2000s British medical television series
Cultural depictions of dentists
2000s Canadian medical television series